Trichomycterus punctulatus is a species of fish of the family  Trichomycteridae, native to freshwater habitats in western Peru.

Range, habitat and behavior
This nocturnal freshwater fish is endemic to western Peru, ranging at least from Lambayeque and Cajamarca to Tacna. It mostly lives in rivers and streams, but can also be found in habitats such as small lakes and paddy fields. It is an opportunistic predator that mainly feeds on insects, but also will take small crustaceans and plant material (algae and remains of phanerogams).

Importance to humans
It is fished and plays an important role in the local cuisine in northern Peru, where this species is known as life, pronounced "lee-fey", or life monsefuano (dishes: panquitas de life or sudado de life). Although it can be difficult to ascertain the exact species depicted in the artwork of the ancient Moche culture, it was likely T. punctulatus that was important in their mythology where perhaps recognized as a connection between light and darkness. In excavations of Huaca de la Luna, more than one-quarter of all fish bones were this species, revealing that it already played an important role as a food to the Moche.

References

punctulatus
Fish of Peru
Taxa named by Achille Valenciennes
Fish described in 1846